The Schildflue is a mountain of the Silvretta Alps, located east of Klosters in the canton of Graubünden. With an elevation of 2,887 metres above sea level, the Schildflue is the culminating point of the range that separates the Schlappintal from the valley of Monbiel.

References

External links
 Schildflue on Hikr

Mountains of the Alps
Mountains of Graubünden
Mountains of Switzerland
Two-thousanders of Switzerland
Klosters-Serneus